This is a list of player transfers involving Allianz Premier 15s teams before or during the 2022–23 season. 

The list is of deals that are confirmed and are either from or to a rugby union team competing in the Premier 15s during the 2021–22 season. It is not unknown for confirmed deals to be cancelled at a later date.

Bristol Bears

Players in 
  Lark Davies from  Loughborough Lightning
  Chris Balogun from  Wasps
  Gwenllian Pyrs from  Sale Sharks
  Megan Davies from  Exeter Chiefs
  Claire Molloy from  Wasps
  Beth Stafford from  Sale Sharks
  Megan Barwick from  Bath
  Reneeqa Bonner (promoted from Academy)
  Bo Osborne-Clark (promoted from Academy)
  Lauren Powell (promoted from Academy)
  Tillie Westwood (promoted from Academy)
  Grace White (promoted from Academy)
  Rosie Inman from  DMP Durham Sharks
  Lyndsay O'Donnell from  Worcester Warriors (season-long loan)
  Deborah Wills from  Worcester Warriors (short-term loan)

Players out 
  Siwan Lillicrap to  Gloucester-Hartpury
  Leanne Infante to  Saracens
  Natalia John to  Worcester Warriors
  Rhi Parker to  Llandaff North
  Robyn Lock (retired)
  China-Marie Kill (released)
  Sophie Phillips (released)
  Lillian Stoeger-Goddard (released)
  Hannah Sims to  Harlequins

DMP Durham Sharks

Players in 
  Ella Brewster from  Loughborough Students
  Laura Chapman (unattached)
  Tilly Churm from  Worcester Warriors
  Georgina Holmes from  Harrogate
  Saskia Janzen (unattached)
  Christine Lofthouse-Pratt from  Harrogate
  Rianna Manson from  Harrogate
  Chantelle Miller from  British Army
  Chrissi Nettleton (unattached)
  Susie Badger from  Royal Navy
  Jess Clabby (unattached)
  Kathryn Craine from  Sale Sharks
  Georgia Dolan (unattached)
  Molly Gardener (unattached)
  Olivia Howarth from  Harrogate
  Karolina Kacirkova from  Hull Ionians
  Summer O'Brien (unattached)
  Meg Riley (unattached)
  Josie Scrimgour from  Penrith
  Olivia Ortiz from  Colorado Gray Wolves
  Tess Feury from  Wasps
  Elis Martin from  Edinburgh University
  Meya Bizer from  Beantown
  Kathryn Treder from  Beantown
  Rachel Ehrecke from  Colorado Gray Wolves

Players out 
  Abi Evans to  Saracens
  Cara Cookland to  Sale Sharks
  Alana Bainbridge to  Wasps
  Amy Layzell to  Wasps
  Caitlin Simpson to  Wasps
  Lauren Torley to  Harlequins
  Rosie Inman to  Bristol Bears

Exeter Chiefs

Players in 
  Claudia MacDonald from  Wasps
  Cliodhna Moloney from  Wasps
  Halley Derera from  Brumbies
  Charli Jacoby from  Loughborough Lightning
  Liv McGoverne from  Matatū
  Silvia Turani from  Colorno
  Charlotte Gale from  Exeter College
  Isabella Hartley from  Exeter College
  Danielle Preece from  Exeter College
  Evie Walker from  Exeter College
  Tilly Ryall from  Hartpury College
  Lori Cramer from  NSW Waratahs
  Edel McMahon from  Wasps
  Jodie Ounsley from  Sale Sharks
  Michaela Leonard from  Brumbies
  Panashe Muzambe from  Watsonians
  Robyn Wilkins from  Gloucester-Hartpury

Players out 
  Patricia García (retired)
  Megan Davies to  Bristol Bears
  Olivia Jones to  Gloucester-Hartpury
  Laura Delgado to  Gloucester-Hartpury
  Louise Burgess (released)
  Olivia Churcher (released)
  Grace Eckford (released)
  Daisy French (released)
  Lottie Holland (released)
  McKinley Hunt (released)
  Sachiko Kato (released)
  Kanako Kobayashi (released)
  Lauren Leatherland (released)
  Garnet Mackinder (released)
  Alia McCarthy (released)
  Zintle Mpupha (released)
  Niamh Terry (released)
  Jess Thomas (released)
  Caitlin Lewis to  Gloucester-Hartpury
  Chloe Rollie to  Loughborough Lightning

Gloucester-Hartpury

Players in 
  Maud Muir from  Wasps
  Alex Matthews from  Worcester Warriors
  Siwan Lillicrap from  Bristol Bears
  Olivia Jones from  Exeter Chiefs
  Laura Delgado from  Exeter Chiefs
  Lizzie Goulden from  Wasps
  Sam Monaghan from  Wasps
  Sarah Beckett from  Harlequins
  Caitlin Lewis from  Exeter Chiefs

Players out 
  Anna Caplice (released)
  Kristine Sommer (released)
  Shya Pinnock to  Wasps
  Robyn Wilkins to  Exeter Chiefs

Harlequins

Players in 
  Ellie Boatman from  Wasps
  Emily Chancellor from  NSW Waratahs
  Bella McKenzie from  NSW Waratahs
  Lauren Torley from  DMP Durham Sharks
  Kaitlan Leaney from  NSW Waratahs
  Bryony Cleall from  Wasps
  Lénaïg Corson from  Wasps
  Grace Clavering (promoted from Academy)
  Carys Graham (promoted from Academy)
  Eloise Harris (promoted from Academy)
  Lucy Heryet (promoted from Academy)
  Lucy Hoad (promoted from Academy)
  Kira Leat (promoted from Academy)
  Sophie Molton (promoted from Academy)
  Ellie Roberts (promoted from Academy)
  Katie Shillaker (promoted from Academy)
  Jessie Spurrier (promoted from Academy)
  Sophie Stafford (promoted from Academy)
  Abby Dow from  Wasps
  Hannah Sims from  Bristol Bears

Players out 
  Fi Fletcher (retired)
  Jess Breach to  Saracens
  Sarah Beckett to  Gloucester-Hartpury
  Polly Roberts to  Wasps
  Tove Viksten (retired)
  Shaunagh Brown (retired)

Loughborough Lightning

Players in 
  Daisy Hibbert-Jones from  Sale Sharks
  Molly Kelly from  Sale Sharks
  Chloe Rollie from  Exeter Chiefs

Players out 
  Lark Davies to  Bristol Bears
  Charli Jacoby to  Exeter Chiefs
  Isla Alejandro to  Saracens
  Iona Antwis to  Sale Sharks
  Eloise Hayward to  Wasps

Sale Sharks

Players in 
  Alycia Washington from  Worcester Warriors
  Iona Antwis from  Loughborough Lightning
  Cara Cookland from  DMP Durham Sharks
  Sophie Jones from  Waterloo
  Kay Searcy from  Wasps
  Niamh Swales from  Gateshead College
  Sara Tounesi from  Clermont Auvergne
  Carly Waters from  Saracens

Players out 
  Gwenllian Pyrs to  Bristol Bears
  Beth Stafford to  Bristol Bears
  Daisy Hibbert-Jones to  Loughborough Lightning
  Molly Kelly to  Loughborough Lightning
  Jodie Ounsley to  Exeter Chiefs
  Kathryn Craine to  DMP Durham Sharks

Saracens

Players in 
  Leanne Infante from  Bristol Bears
  Grace Moore from  Railway Union
  Taryn Schutzler from  Ulster
  Jess Breach from  Harlequins
  Louise McMillan from  Hillhead Jordanhill
  Abi Evans from  DMP Durham Sharks
  Isla Alejandro from  Loughborough Lightning
  Eloise Bloomfield from  Old Albanians (promoted from Academy)
  Kirsty Exley from  Old Albanians (promoted from Academy)
  Chloe Flanagan (promoted from Academy)
  Mica Gooding from  Old Albanians (promoted from Academy)
  Katie Johnson (promoted from Academy)
  Sharifa Kasolo from  Blackheath (promoted from Academy)
  Chloe Langdale (promoted from Academy)
  Lizzie Musa from  Stade Rennais
  Flo Long from  Worcester Warriors (short-term loan)
  Mica Evans from  Wasps
  Flo Williams from  Wasps
  Maya Montiel from  University of Ottawa

Players out 
  Tamara Taylor (retired)
  Carly Waters to  Sale Sharks
  Katie Barnes (released)
  Alev Kelter (released)
  Ellie Lennon to  Wasps
  Tilly Vaughan-Fowler to  Wasps

University of Worcester Warriors

Players in 
  Natalia John from  Bristol Bears
  Lowri Norkett from  Ospreys
  Evie Gallagher from  Stirling County
  Siobhán McCarthy from  Railway Union

Players out 
  Lisa Campbell (retired)
  Alex Matthews to  Gloucester-Hartpury
  Ursula Hardy (released)
  Lowri Williams (released)
  Alycia Washington to  Sale Sharks
  Tilly Churm to  DMP Durham Sharks
  Flo Long to  Saracens (short-term loan)
  Lyndsay O'Donnell to  Bristol Bears (season-long loan)
  Deborah Wills to  Bristol Bears (short-term loan)

Wasps

Players in 
  Cris Blanco from  Olímpico de Pozuelo
  Eloise Hayward from  Loughborough Lightning
  Lénaïg Corson from  Stade Français
  Alana Bainbridge from  DMP Durham Sharks
  Fiona Cooper from  Corstorphine Cougars
  Amy Layzell from  DMP Durham Sharks
  Ellie Lennon from  Saracens
  Shya Pinnock from  Gloucester-Hartpury
  Polly Roberts from  Harlequins
  Molly Saunders from  Richmond
  Caitlin Simpson from  DMP Durham Sharks
  Tilly Vaughan-Fowler from  Saracens
  Georgia Wood from  London Irish Wild Geese

Players out 
  Chris Balogun to  Bristol Bears
  Maud Muir to  Gloucester-Hartpury
  Claire Molloy to  Bristol Bears
  Lizzie Goulden to  Gloucester-Hartpury
  Claudia MacDonald to  Exeter Chiefs
  Cliodhna Moloney to  Exeter Chiefs
  Ellie Boatman to  Harlequins
  Sam Monaghan to  Gloucester-Hartpury
  Edel McMahon to  Exeter Chiefs
  Kay Searcy to  Sale Sharks
  Bryony Cleall to  Harlequins
  Lénaïg Corson to  Harlequins
  Mica Evans to  Saracens
  Flo Williams to  Saracens
  Abby Dow to  Harlequins
  Tess Feury to  DMP Durham Sharks

See also 
List of 2022–23 Premiership Rugby transfers
List of 2022–23 United Rugby Championship transfers
List of 2022–23 RFU Championship transfers
List of 2022–23 Super Rugby transfers
List of 2022–23 Top 14 transfers
List of 2022–23 Rugby Pro D2 transfers
List of 2022–23 Major League Rugby transfers

References 

Premier 15s
2022–23 in English rugby union
2022 in English women's sport
2023 in English women's sport